The Bode Valley Gondola Lift is a gondola lift built between 1969 and 1970 by the Czechoslovak collective combine Transporta Chrudim as a joint project with PGH Elektrotherm Quedlinburg in the vicinity of Thale in the Harz mountains in Lower Saxony, Germany. The other two pylons are designed for the gondola cabins to run over the top of them because of the steep inclines. The lift has 38 small cabins or 'gondolas', each with a capacity of 6 persons. The Bode Valley Gondola Lift operates all-year round (except for November). The cost is €3 for adults one-way (as at Aug 2011).

See also 
Wurmberg Gondola Lift

External links
 Official website of Thale valley aerial lifts (German)
 Diagram of the tower on skyscraperpage

Transport in the Harz
Buildings and structures in Lower Saxony